The 2022 Road Safety World Series was the second season of an international T20 cricket league, which featured former international cricketers and was organized by the Road Safety World Series (RSWS) to raise awareness about road safety. 

The Road Safety World Series was founded by Ravi Gaikwad and approved by the BCCI.

New Zealand Legends were the new entrants this edition and they joined the legendary players from India, England, Sri Lanka, West Indies, South Africa, Australia, and Bangladesh during the event played primarily to create awareness towards road safety in the country and around the globe. The Road Safety World Series was supported by the Ministry of Road Transport and Highways and the Ministry of Electronics and Information Technology and Ministry of Youth Affairs and Sports of the Government of India.

Background 
Initially, the second season was supposed to be held in India and the UAE from 5th February 2022, but it was entirely moved to the UAE and scheduled to start from March 1st to March 19th, 2022 because the number of positive cases rose due to Omicron variant in India. The tournament suffered a setback when Sachin Tendulkar pulled out of the tournament as he did not receive his payment from the first season along with players from Bangladesh like Khaled Mahmud, Khaled Mashud, Mehrab Hossain, Rajin Saleh, Hannan Sarkar and Nafees Iqbal as they also did not receive any payments from the previous season. The payments were eventually received by the players and the tournament was scheduled to be hosted in the last week of May and June across Lucknow, Visakhapatnam, Hyderabad and Indore. In April, it was confirmed that Sachin Tendulkar will return for the tournament and scheduled to be hosted from June 4th till July 3rd in Lucknow, Indore and Jodhpur, but it was eventually postponed for another 3 months due to a conflict in MoU between the organizers.

The series was finally announced with Sachin Tendulkar returning as the captain of India Legends in the second edition and the addition of New Zealand Legends team led by Ross Taylor. The tournament was scheduled to be played from September 10 to October 1, 2022 in Kanpur, Raipur, Indore and Dehradun with Kanpur hosting the opener and Raipur hosting the two semi-finals and final. On September 14, the tournament fixtures were updated and timings for some of the matches were changed along with the dates.

Venues 
The matches were played in Green Park Stadium in Kanpur, Holkar Stadium in Indore, Rajiv Gandhi International Cricket Stadium in Dehradun and Shaheed Veer Narayan Singh International Cricket Stadium, in Raipur with the semi-finals and final played on October 1, 2022, in Raipur.

Squads

Points table 

  Qualified to the semi-finals

Tie-break criteria 
 Number of wins.
 Head-to-head results. 
 If three or more teams are tied on points and the number of wins, positions to be decided by NRR.

League stage 

All times are according to Indian Standard Time (IST).

Knockout stage 

On 29 September 2022, playing conditions for the semifinals and final were announced.

 At the advent of a match getting washed out due to rain, the outcome of the game will be decided by toss of the coin.

 If the final is also washed out due to rain, then both finalists will share the trophy.

Bracket 
{{4TeamBracket
|RD1=Semi-finals
|RD2=Final
|seed-width=25px
|team-width=200px
|score-width=125px
|RD1-seed1=2
|RD1-team1=  Australia Legends
|RD1-score2= 175/5 (19.2 overs) 
|RD1-seed2=3
|RD1-team2=  India Legends
|RD1-score1=171/5 (20 overs)
|RD1-seed3=1|RD1-team3= Sri Lanka Legends|RD1-score3=172/9 (20 overs)|RD1-seed4=4
|RD1-team4= West Indies Legends
|RD1-score4= 158/7 (20 overs)
|RD2-seed1=3|RD2-team1= India Legends|RD2-score1=195/6 (20 overs)'|RD2-seed2=1
|RD2-team2= Sri Lanka Legends 
|RD2-score2= 162 (18.5 overs)
}}

 Semi-finals 

 Semi-final 1: India Legends v Australia Legends 

 Semi-final 2: Sri Lanka Legends v West Indies Legends 

 Final 

Statistics
The top 5 players in each category are listed.
 Most runs 

 Most wickets 

Broadcasting
Viacom 18 is the official broadcasting partner of this tournament. Colors Cineplex, Colors Cineplex Superhits, Sports 18 Khel'' and Sports18 broadcast the tournament, and live streaming on Voot and Jio TV apps.

References

Road safety campaigns
Twenty20 cricket leagues
2022 in cricket